In chess, a back-rank checkmate (also known as the corridor mate) is a checkmate delivered by a rook or queen along a back rank (that is, the row on which the pieces [not pawns] stand at the start of the game) in which the mated king is unable to move up the board because the king is blocked by friendly pieces (usually pawns) on the second rank. A typical position is shown to the right.

Introduction
Back-rank mates occur quite often in games at fairly low levels.  This is because beginners typically fail to anticipate an impending mate on the back rank.  At higher levels of play, though the mate itself does not occur very often, play is often affected by the possibility of it—the fact that a player has to spend time guarding against the mate may leave them vulnerable to other threats and tactical ideas.

Back-rank mates are often guarded against by a friendly rook or queen protecting the back rank. However, it may be possible for the attacking side to deflect one of these pieces away from defensive duties. In the example shown to the left, White can play 1.Qxc6 and black cannot reply 1...Rxc6 because of 2.Rd8+ Rxd8 3.Rxd8# with a back-rank mate. Black therefore loses his bishop for no compensation—and Black has no good continuation because of the threat of Qxa8 or Qxc8, for example, 1...Qa6 2.Qxa8! Rxa8 3.Rd8+ Rxd8 4.Rxd8#. If Black tries to defend the back rank so that White's queen and bishop are skewered, White can keep an extra piece, for example 1...b5 (defending d8 with the queen) 2.Qf3! keeping the rook on c8 stuck to the defense of the rook on a8, or 1...g6 (creating luft) 2.Qf6! and Black still cannot take due to the back-rank mate.

Back-rank threats can be guarded against more permanently by moving one of the pawns in front of the king to give the king a flight square (or luft). If it were Black to play in the example to the left, he could counter White's threat with, for example, 1...g6, giving the king a square on g7 to which it can safely move. Note, however, that 1...h6 in this example would not do the job, as after the d3-rook moves, the h7-square is covered by the white bishop.

It is often not a good idea to play such pawn moves unless there is a pressing need to do so, as they can not only represent a loss of time, but may also allow enemy penetration around the squares weakened by the pawn advance. In many chess openings, however, they are often played for some other purpose, before any back-rank threat has emerged (...h6 is often played to "put the question" to a white bishop on g5, for example; see also Fianchetto).

Example

One of José Raúl Capablanca's most famous games featured a variety of back-rank threats at the end. It was an exhibition game played in Moscow in 1914 against Ossip Bernstein (Capablanca had the black pieces). The position shown to the right was reached after White's 29th move. Capablanca now played 29...Qb2! The simplest point is that 30.Qxb2 is not possible because of the back-rank mate 30...Rd1#, but there are several related ideas: for example, 30.Qe1, apparently defending the threatened rook, loses to 30...Qxc3 (if 31.Qxc3 then 31...Rd1+ 32.Qe1 Rxe1#); 30.Rc2 fails to 30...Qb1+ 31.Qf1 Qxc2; and 30.Qc2 loses to 30...Qa1+ 31.Qc1 Rd1+ 32.Qxd1 Qxd1#, or 30...Qxc2 31.Rxc2 Rd1#. After 30.Rc8 it looks like white may turn the tables as 30...Rxc8? allows 31.Qxb2 to win a queen for a rook, however Capablanca has 30...Qa1+ (or Qb1+) when instead White loses a rook after 31.Qf1 Qxf1+ 32.Kxf1 Rxc8. Similarly, 30.Qd3 loses to 30...Qa1+ (not 30...Rxd3?? 31.Rc8+) 31.Qf1 Qxc3. So Bernstein had to resign.

Note that had Capablanca played for the back-rank mate more directly with 29...Qb1+ 30.Qf1 Rd1?? (30...Qxa2 would be sensible), he would himself have lost to the back-rank mate 31.Rc8+ Rd8 32.Rxd8#.

References

External links
 How to Play Chess:Back-rank mate audio.
  The United States Chess Federation - A Common Tactic: The Back Rank Problem by GM Susan Polgar, August 6, 2008

Chess checkmates
Chess terminology
Chess tactics